The highest-selling albums and EPs in the United States are ranked in the Billboard 200, which is published by Billboard magazine. The data are compiled by Nielsen Soundscan based on each album's weekly physical and digital sales, as well as on-demand streaming and digital sales of its individual tracks. In 2016, a total of 33 albums claimed the top position of the chart. One of which, English singer Adele's 25 started its peak issue dated December 12, 2015.

Canadian rapper Drake's fourth studio album, Views, became the second best-selling overall album with 1.04 million equivalent album units, selling 852,000 copies in its first week of release, and achieving over 245 million streams, more than previous record 115.2 million by Beyoncé's Lemonade. Lemonade is the third overall best-seller, incurring 485,000 copies in its first week (653,000 with additional album-equivalent units).

Chart history

See also
 2016 in American music
 List of Billboard Hot 100 number ones of 2016

References

2016
United States Albums